Harry M. Clabaugh (July 16, 1856 – March 6, 1914) was an Associate Justice and Chief Justice of the Supreme Court of the District of Columbia.

Education and career

Born in Cumberland, Maryland, Clabaugh received a Bachelor of Laws from the University of Maryland School of Law in 1878. He was in private practice in Baltimore, Maryland, from 1878 to 1880, and in Carroll County, Maryland, from 1880 to 1904. He was Chairman of the Republican State Central Committee from 1891 to 1899. He was Attorney General of Maryland from 1895 to 1904.

Federal judicial service

Clabaugh was nominated by President William McKinley on February 21, 1899, to an Associate Justice seat on the Supreme Court of the District of Columbia (now the United States District Court for the District of Columbia) vacated by Associate Justice Louis E. McComas. He was confirmed by the United States Senate on March 2, 1899, and received his commission the same day. His service terminated on May 1, 1903, due to his elevation to be Chief Justice of the same court.

Clabaugh received a recess appointment from President Theodore Roosevelt on April 1, 1903, to the Chief Justice seat on the Supreme Court of the District of Columbia (now the United States District Court for the District of Columbia) vacated by Chief Justice Edward Franklin Bingham. He was nominated to the same position by President Roosevelt on November 10, 1903. He was confirmed by the Senate on November 16, 1903, and received his commission the same day. His service terminated on March 6, 1914, due to his death in Washington, D.C.

References

Sources
 

1856 births
1914 deaths
Lawyers from Cumberland, Maryland
Judges of the United States District Court for the District of Columbia
United States federal judges appointed by William McKinley
United States district court judges appointed by Theodore Roosevelt
20th-century American judges
Maryland Attorneys General
19th-century American politicians
Politicians from Cumberland, Maryland
Deans of Georgetown University Law Center